Kayalkkarayil is a 1968 Indian Malayalam film, directed and produced by N. Prakash. The film stars Prem Nazir, Sheela, Jayabharathi and Adoor Bhasi in the lead roles. The film had musical score by Vijayabhaskar.

Cast
Prem Nazir
Sheela
Jayabharathi
Adoor Bhasi
P. J. Antony
Raghavan
G. K. Pillai
K. P. Ummer

Soundtrack
The music was composed by Vijayabhaskar and the lyrics were written by P. Bhaskaran.

References

External links
 

1968 films
1960s Malayalam-language films